Francisca Crovetto Chadid (born April 27, 1990 in Santiago) is a Chilean sport shooter. She won a silver medal in the women's skeet at the 2011 Pan American Games in Guadalajara, Mexico, accumulating a score of 89 targets, and a bronze medal in the same event at the 2015 Pan American Games in Toronto.

Crovetto represented Chile at the 2012 Summer Olympics in London, where she competed as the nation's lone shooter in the women's skeet. She placed eighth in the qualifying rounds of her event by one point behind Sweden's Therese Lundqvist, with a total score of 66 targets.  At the 2016 Summer Olympics, she was again Chile's lone representative in the sport shooting, finishing in 19th.

She represented Chile at the 2020 Summer Olympics.

References

External links
NBC Olympics Profile

1990 births
Living people
Chilean female sport shooters
Skeet shooters
Olympic shooters of Chile
Shooters at the 2012 Summer Olympics
Shooters at the 2016 Summer Olympics
Shooters at the 2011 Pan American Games
Pan American Games silver medalists for Chile
Sportspeople from Santiago
Shooters at the 2015 Pan American Games
Chilean people of Arab descent
Chilean people of Italian descent
Pan American Games bronze medalists for Chile
Pan American Games medalists in shooting
South American Games silver medalists for Chile
South American Games medalists in shooting
Competitors at the 2014 South American Games
Shooters at the 2019 Pan American Games
Medalists at the 2011 Pan American Games
Medalists at the 2015 Pan American Games
Medalists at the 2019 Pan American Games
Shooters at the 2020 Summer Olympics
20th-century Chilean women
21st-century Chilean women